The Manx Group is an Ordovician lithostratigraphic group (a sequence of rock strata) in the Isle of Man in the Irish Sea. The name is derived from the name of the island which is largely formed from them; these rocks have also previously been referred to as the Manx Slates or Manx Slates Series. The group comprises dark mudstones with siltstone laminae and some sandstones and which exceed a thickness of 3000m. It is divided into a lowermost Glen Dhoo Formation which is overlain by (though the entire known boundary is faulted) the Lonan, Mull Hill, Creg Agneash and Maughold formations in ascending order. A fault separates these from the overlying Barrule, Injebreck, Glen Rushen and Creggan Mooar formations which are in turn separated by a fault from an overlying Ladyport Formation.

In stratigraphic order (youngest at top) the formations are:
Ladyport
--faulted boundary--
Creggan Mooar
Glen Rushen
Injebreck
Barrule
--faulted boundary--
Maughold
Creg Agneash
Mull Hill
Lonan
Ny Garvain member
Santon member
Keristal member
--faulted boundary--
Glen Dhoo

References

 

Geological groups of the United Kingdom
Ordovician System of Europe
Geology of the Isle of Man